Upstream PH (stylized as UPSTREAM.ph) is a Philippine over-the-top content platform. It is founded by Filipino filmmakers and Reality Entertainment co-owners Erik Matti and Dondon Monteverde.

The service provides movies, webseries, concerts and sporting events, including upcoming bouts of Filipino boxer Manny Pacquiao. It serves as a streaming platform for upcoming film releases and webseries from various film studios such as Regal Entertainment, Reality Entertainment, and Anima (formerly Globe Studios). Both Upstream and Anima are owned by Kroma Entertainment, which in turn, is backed by Globe Telecom.

History
Upstream was launched in November 14, 2020, as a response to the tightened strict measures on the COVID-19 pandemic on the film industry in the Philippines.

In partnership with Globe Telecom, it became the official streaming provider of the 2020 Metro Manila Film Festival.

In May 2021, Upstream signed a video-on-demand (VOD) agreement with Comcast/NBCUniversal's Universal Pictures to carry the Hollywood film studio's library of movies, including upcoming theatrical releases.

Release

Films

Web series

Notes

References

Philippine entertainment websites
Video on demand services
Streaming television
Internet properties established in 2020
Globe Telecom subsidiaries